The 50th birthday of Adolf Hitler on 20 April 1939 was celebrated as a national holiday throughout Nazi Germany. Minister of Propaganda Joseph Goebbels made sure the events organised in Berlin were a lavish spectacle focusing on Hitler. The festivities included a vast military parade with some 40,000 to 50,000 German troops taking part, along with 162 Luftwaffe airplanes flying overhead. The parade was intended in part as a warning to the Western powers of Nazi Germany's military capabilities. The parade lasted for more than four hours, with 20,000 official guests, along with several hundred thousand spectators being present.

Celebrations

On 18 April 1939, the government of Nazi Germany declared that their Führer Adolf Hitler's birthday (20 April) was to be a national holiday. Festivities took place in all municipalities throughout the country as well as in the Free City of Danzig. The British historian Ian Kershaw comments that the events organised in Berlin by the Propaganda Minister Joseph Goebbels were "an astonishing extravaganza of the Führer cult. The lavish outpourings of adulation and sycophancy surpassed those of any previous Führer Birthdays".

Festivities began in the afternoon on the day before his birthday, when Hitler rode in the lead car of a motorcade of fifty white limousines along architect Albert Speer's newly-completed East-West Axis, the central boulevard for planned Welthauptstadt Germania, which was to be the new capital after the victory in World War II. Hitler, anticipating that Speer would give a speech, was amused when he evaded that by briefly announcing that the work should speak for itself. The next event was a torch-lit procession of delegations from all over Germany, which Hitler reviewed from a balcony in the Reich Chancellery. Then, at midnight, Hitler's courtiers congratulated him and presented him with gifts, including "statues, bronze casts, Meissen porcelain, oil-paintings, tapestries, rare coins, antique weapons, and a mass of other presents, many of them kitsch. Hitler admired some, made fun of others, and ignored most".

Speer presented Hitler with a scale model of the gigantic triumphal arch planned for the rebuilding of Berlin, and Hitler's pilot, Hans Baur, gave him a model of the "Führer plane", a four-engined Focke-Wulf Fw 200 Condor that went into service later that year as Hitler's official airplane.

Military parade

A key part of the birthday celebrations was the large demonstration of Nazi Germany's military capabilities. The display was intended in part as a warning to the Western powers. The parade, which lasted for more than four hours, included 12 companies of the Luftwaffe, 12 companies of the army, and 12 companies of the navy and units of the Schutzstaffel (SS). In total, 40,000 to 50,000 German troops took part. 162 warplanes flew over Berlin. The grandstand comprised 20,000 official guests, and the parade was watched by several hundred thousand spectators. Features of the parade were large long-range air-defence artillery guns, emphasis on motorized artillery and development of air-defence units. Joseph Goebbels declared in a broadcast address to the German people:

 
Military leaders throughout the country gave addresses to their troops to celebrate the occasion. Some, such as Major General (later Generalfeldmarschall) Erich von Manstein, were especially effusive in their praise for their supreme commander. Official guests representing 23 countries took part in the celebrations. Papal Nuncio Cesare Orsenigo, Slovak State President Jozef Tiso, the heads of the branches of Nazi Germany's armed forces and mayors of German cities offered birthday congratulations at the chancellery. Hitler and the Italian dictator, Benito Mussolini, exchanged telegrams that assuring each other that the friendship between Germany and the Kingdom of Italy, both of which were ruled by fascist regimes, could not be disturbed by their enemies. The ambassadors of the United Kingdom, France and the United States were not present at the parade since they had been withdrawn after Germany had occupied Czechoslovakia in 1938. The US was represented at the troop review by the chargé d'affaires, Raymond H. Geist. US President Franklin Roosevelt did not congratulate Hitler on his birthday, in accordance with his practice of not sending birthday greetings to anyone but ruling monarchs. British King George VI dispatched a message of congratulation to Hitler, but the strained relations between the two countries made his advisors consider whether he should ignore the birthday altogether.

There was no Polish representation at the parade.

Commemoration

A luxury edition of Hitler's political manifesto and autobiography, Mein Kampf, was published in 1939 in honour of his 50th birthday and was known as the Jubiläumsausgabe ("Anniversary Issue"). It came in both dark blue and sharp red boards with a gold sword on the cover. The German author and photographer Heinrich Hoffmann wrote a book about Hitler's 50th birthday, Ein Volk ehrt seinen Führer ("A Nation Honours its Leader"). The composer  wrote a hymn for the occasion. A film of the birthday celebration, Hitlers 50. Geburtstag ("Hitler's 50th Birthday"), is regarded as an important example of Nazi propaganda and was subsequently shown to packed audiences at Youth Film Hours, which were held on Sundays.

Birthday gifts
The Free City of Danzig made Hitler an honorary citizen of the city as a birthday gift. Hitler received the citizenship papers from the hands of Albert Forster, the city's Nazi leader. Political and military tension between Germany and Poland was heightened at the time, and Time reported the possibility of Danzig being returned to Germany. Martin Bormann, Hitler's private secretary, had the Eagle's Nest constructed as the Nazi Party's birthday gift. Hitler, however, did not like the location, as he had a fear of heights. Because of his indigestion, Hitler did not drink alcohol and so a Munich brewery created a special batch of low-alcohol beer for his birthday. The brew became a regular order.

See also

 Holidays in Nazi Germany

References

Sources

Printed

Online

External links

"Our Hitler" – Goebbels' 1939 Speech on Hitler's 50th Birthday

1939 in Germany
1930s in Berlin
Adolf Hitler
Hitler's 50th birthday
Military parades in Germany
National holidays
Parades in Germany
April 1939 events
Regional anniversaries